"The Night the Lights Went Out in Georgia" is a Southern Gothic murder ballad, written in 1972 by songwriter Bobby Russell and first recorded by his then wife, singer, comedian, and actress Vicki Lawrence. Lawrence's version, from her 1973 album of the same name, went to number one on the US Billboard Hot 100 chart after its release. Of several cover versions, the one recorded by Reba McEntire for her 1991 album For My Broken Heart peaked at number 12 on the Hot Country Songs chart.

Content
The unnamed female narrator tells about how her unnamed brother was hanged for a crime he didn't actually commit (although he had intended to do it): Returning home from a two-week trip to a place called Candletop, a man identified only as "Brother" stops for a drink at Webb's Bar before going home to his wife. While at the bar, he encounters his friend Andy Wolloe, who informs him that while he was gone his bride/wife was having an affair with "that Amos boy, Seth", and then admits that he himself had been with her as well. A now-angry Brother abruptly leaves the bar, and a frightened Andy makes his way home.

Assuming his absent wife has left town, Brother goes home and finds the only thing his father had left him, a gun. Brother then makes his way through the backwoods to Andy's house. On the way there, he notices a set of footprints leading to and from the house, but they are not big enough to have been made by Andy. Arriving at his back door, the man finds Andy inside lying dead on the floor from a gunshot. In a panic, Brother fires a shot in the air to get the attention of the police, only to find himself arrested for Andy's murder. In a show trial, the judge wastes little time declaring Brother guilty and sentences him to death by hanging, which is carried out in short order.

The story wraps up as the narrator reveals that she is the sister of the "innocent man" and that it was her footprints that Brother saw on his way to Andy's house. She then confesses that she had not only killed Andy, but her brother’s adulterous wife as well, disposing of the latter's body where she is certain nobody will ever find it, saying "That's one body that'll never be found," and boasting, "Little Sister don't miss when she aims her gun."

In the song's chorus, the singer blames the local criminal justice system for Brother's death, warning the listener, "Don't trust your soul to no backwoods Southern lawyer, 'cause the judge in the town's got blood stains on his hands."

History and original recording
Although Bobby Russell both wrote the lyrics and composed the music for the song, he was reluctant to record even a demonstration because he didn't like it. Lawrence, who was married to Russell at the time, believed the song was a hit and recorded the demo. The publishers and the record label did not know how to pitch the song, as it was not a country or a pop song. The first thought was to offer the song to actress/singer Liza Minnelli, but eventually it was offered to singer Cher, but her then-husband and manager Sonny Bono reportedly refused it, as he was said to be concerned that the song might offend Cher's Southern fans. Without a singer to record the song, Lawrence, along with producer Snuff Garrett, went into a studio and recorded it professionally herself, with the instrumental backing of L.A. session musicians from the Wrecking Crew.

Release and reception
Released as a single in November 1972, the song went to No. 1 on the Hot 100 chart in 1973 when Lawrence was a regular performer on the ensemble variety comedy television show The Carol Burnett Show. On March 24, 1973, the final episode of the sixth season, Burnett surprised Lawrence by presenting her with an RIAA gold record for more than a million copies sold. The song hit No. 6 on the Easy Listening chart, and peaked at No. 36 on Billboard's Hot Country Singles chart. It was No. 1 for two weeks on the Billboard Hot 100, and was topped by Tony Orlando and Dawn's "Tie a Yellow Ribbon Round the Ole Oak Tree." Billboard ranked it as the No. 11 song for 1973. 

In Canada, the single version went to No. 1 on the RPM 100 national singles chart on May 5, 1973. On the RPM Country Singles chart, it reached No. 25.

Musical structure
The lyrics use an AABCCB rhyming pattern on the verses, and ABAB on the chorus. The song's verses are in C Dorian. Verse one consists of four lines, each using the chord pattern Cm-B/C-Cm-F/C-Cm-Gm7-Cm. At the chorus, the song modulates to the key of G major, with a chord pattern of Am-D7-G-Em used three times before ending on Am-D7-Gm.

Verse two uses the same structure as verse one, with an additional two lines. The first additional line also modulates to G major with a chord pattern of Am-D7-G-Em-Am-D-Gm, before returning to C Dorian for another repetition of the original chord pattern. After the second chorus, the third verse consists of two lines before the chorus is sung a third time. The song ends with a four-measure riff in G minor. The vocal range is G-D.

Cover versions

Tanya Tucker 
In 1981, country singer Tanya Tucker recorded a version with differing lyrics and an altered timeline, based on the plot of the 1981 film The Night the Lights Went Out in Georgia. Tucker's cover is included on the film's soundtrack album.

Reba McEntire 
During 1991, the song was covered by Reba McEntire on her album For My Broken Heart. It reached No. 12 on Billboard's Hot Country Songs chart. While still a commercially successful release, it broke a string of 24 consecutive top 10 country singles by McEntire.

Jack Cole directed a music video for the McEntire single, in which the older brother of the story is given the name Raymond Brody. The video included spoken dialogue expanding on the song's plot points, including the suggestion that the judge convicted Brody despite knowing Brody was innocent, because he (the judge) feared a trial would expose that he had also had an affair with the wife, played by Playboy centerfold/pin up model Barbara Moore. In the video, the little sister, played by McEntire, as a young woman in flashbacks and as a 60-year-old woman, catches her fiancé, Andy, in the act with her brother's wife.

During a promotional tour for the song, Lawrence and McEntire performed the song as a duet on Lawrence's talk show Vicki! using the McEntire backing track.

In popular culture
"The Night the Lights Went Out in Georgia" is an example of a twist ending in a song. In the 1992 film Reservoir Dogs, the mobster named Nice Guy Eddie, played by Chris Penn, says, "...this is the first time I ever realized that the girl singin' the song is the one who shot Andy."
Using the Pete Schofield and The Canadians's rendition, the opening and closing motifs is sampled in "The Time Is Now," which American professional wrestler John Cena used as his entrance music.

Chart performance

Vicki Lawrence version

Year-end charts

All-time charts

Reba McEntire version

Certifications

Year-end charts

See also
Murder ballad
 List of 1970s one-hit wonders in the United States

References

External links
 
 

1972 singles
1992 singles
Country ballads
1970s ballads
Vicki Lawrence songs
Tanya Tucker songs
Reba McEntire songs
Billboard Hot 100 number-one singles
Cashbox number-one singles
RPM Top Singles number-one singles
Song recordings produced by Tony Brown (record producer)
Songs written by Bobby Russell
Bell Records singles
MCA Records singles
Song recordings produced by Snuff Garrett
1972 songs
Murder ballads
Songs about infidelity
Songs about Georgia (U.S. state)